GCA may refer to:

Education 
Cayman Islands
 Grace Christian Academy (Cayman Islands)
Canada:
Glenmore Christian Academy

India
 Government College, Ajmer, Rajasthan
 Government College of Architecture in Lucknow
 Guwahati College of Architecture, in Assam

United Kingdom
 Greig City Academy, in London
 GCA Network Ltd, in London

United States
 Gahanna Christian Academy, in Columbus, Ohio
 Garland Christian Academy, in Garland, Texas
 Georgia-Cumberland Academy, in Calhoun, Georgia
 Georgia Cyber Academy, in Atlanta, Georgia
 Global Communications Academy, in Hartford, Connecticut
 Granville Christian Academy, in Granville, Ohio
 Greenbrier Christian Academy, in Chesapeake, Virginia

Science and mathematics 
 GCA (gene)
 Generalized Clifford algebra
 Geochimica et Cosmochimica Acta, a scientific journal
 Giant-cell arteritis
 GCA, a codon for the amino acid alanine

Sport 
 Geelong Cricket Association, in Australia
 Goa Cricket Association, in India
 Gujarat Cricket Association, in India

Other uses 
 Garden Centers of America, an American trade organization
 GCA Airlines, a Colombia airline
 GCA Games Convention Asia, a video game and interactive technology convention
 GCA Savvian, an American investment bank
 Giant cell arteritis, a disorder
 Global Cargo Association Ltd, in London
 Global Center on Adaptation, an international organization aiming to accelerate climate change adaptation solutions.
 Global Coalition for Africa, a North-South forum that aims to address Africa's most critical development issues.
 Gothenburg City Airport, in Sweden
 Grand Canyon Association, an American fundraising organization
 Grand Central Airport (United States), a former airport in Glendale, California, United States
 Grand China Air, a Chinese airline
 The Great Canadian Appathon, a Canadian game design and development competition
 Great Commission Association, an association of evangelical Christian churches
 Greek Cypriot Administration of Southern Cyprus, a name used for the internationally recognized Republic of Cyprus by Turkey since they do not recognize it
 The Greeting Card Association, a British trade organization
 Ground-controlled approach
 Groceries Code Adjudicator, in the United Kingdom
 Gun Control Act of 1968, a U.S. federal law
 Gun Control Australia, an Australian lobbying group